Tamara Kamenszain (9 February 1947 – 28 July 2021) was an Argentine poet and essayist.

Biography 
Kamenszain was born in Buenos Aires. She studied philosophy and worked in journalism from a very young age, editing the Culture sections of newspapers La Opinión and Clarín.

Later, she devoted herself to teaching literature at the University of Buenos Aires and the Autonomous University of Mexico.

Her essays on Argentinian and Latin American poetry are the subject of study in universities in Argentina and abroad. Her books of poetry have been totally or partially translated into several languages. Along with Arturo Carrera and Néstor Perlongher, she belonged to the 1970s generation of poets known as Neo-Baroque.

She was founder and general advisor of the bachelor's degree in Writing Arts at the National University of the Arts (UNA).

Awards 

 Premio Honorífico José Lezama Lima awarded by Casa de las Américas, Cuba, 2015.
 Platinum Konex Award 2014: Poetry.
 2012  Buenos Aires Book Fair Critics' Award, for La novela de la poesía en abril de 2013.
 First Prize. Third Hispanic American Poetry Contest "Festival de la Lira", Concedido a "El eco de mi madre". 2011.
 Pablo Neruda Centennial Medal of Honor awarded by the President of Chile.. July 2004 2004.
 Konex Award Merit Diploma 1994. (Poetry).
 First Essay Prize. Government of the City of Buenos Aires, awarded to the published production of the three-year period 1993-1996 for La edad de la poesía.
 John Simon Guggenheim Memorial Foundation Fellowship. Género: poetry (1988–89)
 Third National Essay Prize, awarded to the published production of the three-year period 1983–86, for El texto silencioso (The Silent Text).
 Finalist for the Anagrama Essay Prize, with El texto silencioso (1980).
 Poetry Production Support Award. Awarded to De este lado del Mediterráneo by the Fondo Nacional de las Artes de Argentina (1972).

Works

Poetry 
 1973: De este lado del Mediterráneo
 1977: Los No
 1986: La casa grande
 1991: Vida de living 
 1998: Tango Bar
 2003: El Ghetto
 English translation:The Ghetto (2011; translation by Seth Michelson)
 2005: Solos y solas 
 English translation: Men and women alone (2010; translation by Cecilia Rossi)
 2010: El eco de mi madre
 English translation: The Echo of My Mother (2012: translation by Cecilia Rossi)
 2012: La novela de la poesía: poesía reunida
 2014: El libro de los divanes
 2021: Chicas en tiempos suspendidos

Essays 
 1983: El texto silencioso: tradición y vanguardia en la poesía sudamericana
 1996: La edad de la poesía
 2000: Historias de amor y otros ensayos sobre poesía
 2006: La boca del testimonio: lo que dice la poesía
 2016: Una intimidad inofensiva: Los que escriben con lo que hay
 2018: El libro de Tamar

References

External links 
 Tamara Kamenszain profile in the Jewish Women's Archive
 Tamara Kamenszain en el Festival de Poesía Salida al Mar 2008.
 Tamara Kamenszain. Audiovideoteca de Buenos Aires.
 Entrevista en Página/12.

1947 births
2021 deaths
Argentine women poets
21st-century Argentine poets
20th-century Argentine poets
Argentine essayists
People from Buenos Aires
Jewish women writers
Jewish poets
Argentine Jews